Hi-Tech Institute of Technology, Aurangabad (HITA) is an Indian engineering college located in Aurangabad, Maharashtra. It offers degree courses of Bachelor of Technology.

Vision
Become a university class institution by inculcating confidence in students with advanced technology of respective programmes to solve the problems of industry and society.

Mission
 Impart industry oriented education based on practicals & theoretical knowledge in science and technical subjects.
 Provide platform to improve confidence, communication, leadership and managerial skills.
 Provide exposure and practical experience for advanced technologies in the respective field.
 Make students competent to serve society by exposing them to cultural, sports, NSS, NCC, etc. activities.

Academics
Hi-Tech Institute of Technology, Aurangabad is approved by AICTE, New Delhi, Directorate of Technical Education, Maharashtra, and affiliated with Dr. Babasaheb Ambedkar Technological University, Lonere, Raigad and offers a 4-year degree course in Bachelor of Technology. There are 4 specializations for this degree as follows:
 Computer Science and Engineering
 Civil Engineering
 Mechanical Engineering
 Computer Science and Engineering ( Artificial Intelligence and Machine Learning )

Student associations
The three student's associations are:
 MESA (Mechanical Engg. Students Association)
 ambITion (the IT student's Association)
 CESA (Computer Science & Engg. Students Association)

References

External links 
 HIT website
 Location of HIT on Wikimapia

Engineering colleges in Maharashtra
Education in Aurangabad, Maharashtra
Educational institutions established in 2001
2001 establishments in Maharashtra